The 10th Thailand National Games (Thai: กีฬาเขตแห่งประเทศไทย ครั้งที่ 10, also known as the 1976 National Games and the 1976 Interprovincial Games) were held in Udon Thani, Thailand from 4 to 10 December 1976, with matches in 14 sports and athletes from 10 regions.

Emblem
The emblem of 1976 Thailand National Games was a red circle, with a royal crown on top, the emblem of Sports Authority of Thailand on the inside, and surrounded by the text

Participating regions
The 10th Thailand National Games represented 10 regions from 71 provinces.

Sports
The 1977 Thailand National Games featured 10 Olympic sports contested at the 1977 Southeast Asian Games, 1978 Asian Games and 1976 Summer Olympics. In addition, four non-Olympic sports was featured: badminton, sepak takraw, table tennis and tennis.

References

External links
 Sports Authority of Thailand (SAT)

National Games
Thailand National Games
National Games
Thailand National Games
National Games